Richard Fort (1822 – 2 July 1868) was a Liberal Party politician in England.

He was the son of industrialist John Fort of Read Hall, a Manchester calico printer and MP for Clitheroe. He succeeded his father in 1842. He was appointed High Sheriff of Lancashire for 1854.

He was elected as Member of Parliament for Clitheroe at the 1865 general election, and held the seat until his death in 1868.

His son Richard was Clitheroe's MP from 1880 to 1885, and his grandson, also called Richard Fort was MP for Clitheroe from 1950 to 1959.

References

External links 

1822 births
1868 deaths
Liberal Party (UK) MPs for English constituencies
UK MPs 1865–1868
High Sheriffs of Lancashire